Tahmasp I ( or  ; 22 February 1514 – 14 May 1576) was the second shah of Safavid Iran from 1524 to 1576. He was the eldest son of Ismail I and his principal consort, Tajlu Khanum. Ascending the throne after the death of his father on 23 May 1524, the first years of Tahmasp's reign were marked by civil wars between the Qizilbash leaders until 1532, when he asserted his authority and began an absolute monarchy. He soon faced a long-lasting war with the Ottoman Empire, which was divided into three phases. The Ottoman sultan, Suleiman the Magnificent, tried to install his own candidates on the Safavid throne. The war ended with the Peace of Amasya in 1555, with the Ottomans gaining sovereignty over Iraq, much of Kurdistan, and western Georgia. Tahmasp also had conflicts with the Uzbeks of Bukhara over Khorasan, with them repeatedly raiding Herat. In 1528, at the age of fourteen, he defeated the Uzbeks in the Battle of Jam by using artillery, unknown to the other side.

Tahmasp was a patron of the arts and was an accomplished painter himself. He built a royal house of arts for painters, calligraphers and poets. Later in his reign, he came to despise poets, shunning many and exiling them to the Mughal court of India. Tahmasp is known for his religious piety and fervent zealotry for the Shia branch of Islam. He bestowed many privileges on the clergy and allowed them to participate in legal and administrative matters. In 1544 he demanded that the fugitive Mughal emperor Humayun convert to Shi'ism in return for military assistance to reclaim his throne in India. Nevertheless, Tahmasp still negotiated alliances with the Christian powers of the Republic of Venice and the Habsburg monarchy who were also rivals of the Ottoman Empire.

His succession was disputed before his death. When Tahmasp died on 14 May 1576, a civil war followed, leading to the death of most of the royal family. Tahmasp's reign of nearly fifty-two years was the longest of any member of the Safavid dynasty. Although contemporary Western accounts were critical, modern historians describe him as a courageous and able commander who maintained and expanded his father's empire. His reign saw a shift in the Safavid ideological policy; he ended the worshipping of his father as the Messiah by the Turkoman Qizilbash tribes and instead established a public image of a pious and orthodox Shia king. He started a long process followed by his successors to end the Qizilbash influence on Safavid politics, replacing them with the newly-introduced 'third force' containing Islamized Georgians and Armenians.

Name 
"Tahmasp"  (Azerbaijani:Təhmasib) is a New Persian name, ultimately derived from Old Iranian *ta(x)ma-aspa, meaning "having valiant horses." The name is one of the few instances of a name from the epic poem Shahnameh being used by an Islamic-era dynasty based in Iran. In the Shahnameh, Tahmasp is the father of Zaav, the penultimate shah of the mythical Persian Pishdadian dynasty.

Background 
Tahmasp was the second shah of the Safavid dynasty, a family of Kurdish origin, who were sheikhs of a Sufi  (school of Sufism) known as the Safavid order and centred in Ardabil, a city in the northwestern Iran. The first sheikh of the order and eponym of the dynasty, Safi-ad-din Ardabili (d. 1334), married the daughter of Zahed Gilani (d. 1301) and became the master of his father-in-law's order, the Zahediyeh. Two of Safi-ad-Din's descendants, Shaykh Junayd (d. 1460) and his son, Shaykh Haydar (d. 1488), made the order more militant and unsuccessfully tried to expand their domain.

Tahmasp's father, Ismail I, who inherited the leadership the Safavid order from his grandfather, Shaykh Haydar, became shah of Iran in 1501, a state mired in civil war after the collapse of the Timurid Empire. He conquered the territories of the Aq Qoyunlu tribal confederation, the lands of the Chinggisid (Descendant of Genghis Khan) Uzbek Shaybanid dynasty in the eastern Iran, and many city-states by 1512. Ismail's realm included the whole territory of modern Iran, in addition to sovereignty over Georgia, Armenia, Daghestan, and Shirvan in the west, and Herat in the east. Unlike his Sufist ancestors, Ismail believed in Twelver Shia Islam and made it the official religion of the realm. He forced conversion on the Sunni population by abolishing Sunni Sufi orders, seizing their property, and giving the Sunni  (Islamic clergymen) a choice of conversion, death, or exile.

Ismail established the Qizilbash Turkoman tribes as inseparable members of the Safavid administration since they were the "men of the sword" who brought him to power. These "men of the sword" clashed with the other major part of his bureaucracy, the "men of the pen", who controlled the literati and were mainly Persian. The holder of the title was the vicegerent of Ismail and represented him in the royal court. The creation of this new superior title could not cease the clashes between the Qizilbash leaders and Persian bureaucrats, which eventually climaxed in the Battle of Ghazdewan between the Safavids and the Uzbeks, in which Ismail's , the Persian Najm-e Sani, commended the army. The Uzbek victory, during which Najm was captured and executed afterwards, was the result of the desertion of many of the Qizilbash.

The Uzbeks of Bukhara were a recurring problem on the Iranian eastern borders. The Safavids and the Shaybanids rose to power almost simultaneously at the turn of the sixteenth century. By 1503, when Ismail I had taken possession of large parts of the Iranian plateau, Muhammad Shaybani, Khan of Bukhara, had conquered Khwarazm and Khorasan. Ismail defeated and killed Muhammad Shaybani in the Battle of Marv in 1510, returning Khorasan to Iranian possession, though Khwarazm and the Persianate cities in Transoxiana remained in Uzbek hands. Thereafter the possession of Khorasan became the main bone of contention between Safavids and Shaybanids.

In 1514, Ismail's prestige and authority were damaged by his loss in the Battle of Chaldiran against the Ottoman Empire. Before the war with the Ottomans, Ismail promoted himself as a reincarnation of Ali or Husayn. This belief weakened after Chaldiran, and Ismail lost his theological-religious relationship with the disappointed Qizilbash tribes who had previously seen him as invincible. This affected Ismail, who began drinking heavily and never again led an army; this permitted the seizure of power by the Qizilbash tribes which overshadowed Tahmasp's early reign.

Early life 
Abu'l-Fath Tahmasp Mirza was born on 22 February 1514 in Shahabad, a village near Isfahan, as the eldest son of Ismail I and his principal consort, Tajlu Khanum. According to the narrative told by Iranian s (coffeehouse storytellers), on the night of Tahmasp's birth, a storm erupted, with wind, rain, and lightning. Tajlu Khanum, feeling her labour pains beginning, suggested that the royal caravan camp in some village. The royal caravan thus headed to Shahabad. The  (warden) of the village was a Sunni and did not let Tajlu Khanum enter his house, but a Shia resident of the village welcomed her into his modest house. By then, Tajlu Begum's pain had made her faint, and shortly after entering the house gave birth to a son. When the news reached Ismail, he was reportedly "heaped" with utmost joy and happiness, but refrained from seeing his son until his astrologers gave him an auspicious date to do so. When the auspicious hour arrived, the young boy was presented to Ismail and astrologers foresaw his future to be one entwisted with war and peace and that he would have many sons. Ismail named the boy Tahmasp after Ali, the first Imam, told him to do so in his dream.

In 1516, when Tahmasp Mirza was two years old, the province of Khorasan became his fief by Ismail's order. This appointment was specially done to emulate the Timurid dynasty, that followed the Turco-Mongol tradition of appointing the eldest son of a sovereign to govern a prominent province like Khorasan. The centre of this major province, the city of Herat, would go on to be the city where Safavid crown princes were raised, trained, and educated throughout the sixteenth century. In 1517, Ismail appointed the Diyarbakr governor Amir Soltan Mawsillu as Tahmasp's  (tutor) and governor of Balkh, a city in Khorasan. He replaced the Shamlu and Mawsillu governors of Khorasan, who did not join his army during the Battle of Chaldiran for fear of famine. Placing Tahmasp in Herat was an attempt to reduce the growing influence of the Shamlu tribe, which dominated Safavid court politics and held a number of powerful governorships. Ismail also appointed Amir Ghiyath al-Din Mohammad, a prominent Herat figure, as Tahmasp's religious tutor.

A struggle for control of Herat emerged between the two tutors. Amir Soltan arrested Ghiyath al-Din and executed him the following day, but was ousted from his position in 1521 by a sudden raid by the Uzbeks who crossed the Amu Darya and seized portions of the city. Ismail appointed Div Sultan Rumlu as Tahmasp's , and the governorship was given to his younger son, Sam Mirza Safavi. During his years in Herat, Tahmasp developed a love for writing and painting. He became an accomplished painter and dedicated a work to his brother, Bahram Mirza. The painting was a humorous composition of a gathering of Safavid courtiers, featuring music, singing, and wine-drinking.

In the spring of 1524, Ismail became ill on a hunting trip to Georgia and recovered in Ardabil on his way back to the capital.  But he soon developed a high fever which led to his death on 23 May 1524 in Tabriz.

Regency 

The ten-year-old Tahmasp ascended the throne after his father's death under the guardianship of Div Sultan Rumlu, his , the de facto ruler of the realm. Rule by a member of the Rumlu tribe was unacceptable to the other Turkoman tribes of the Qizilbash, especially the Ostajlu and Takkalu. Kopek Sultan, governor of Tabriz and leader of Ostajlu, along with Chuha Sultan, leader of the Takkalu tribe, were Rumlu's strongest opponents. The Takkalu were powerful in Isfahan and Hamadan, and the Ostajlu held Khorasan and the Safavid capital, Tabriz. The triumvirate proved unsustainable, since all sides were dissatisfied with their share of power. In the spring of 1526, a series of battles in northwest Iran between these tribes expanded into Khorasan and became a civil war. The Ostajlu faction was quickly excluded and their leader, Kopek Sultan, was killed by order of Chuha Sultan. During the civil war, the Uzbeks raiders temporarily seized Tus and Astarabad. Rumlu was blamed for the raids and was executed. His execution was performed by Tahmasp himself.

At the behest of the young king, Chuha Sultan, the sole remaining member of the triumvirate, became de facto ruler of the realm from 1527 to 1530. Chuha tried to remove Herat from Shamlu dominance, which led to a conflict between the two tribes. In early 1530, the Herat governor, Hossein Khan Shamlu, and his men killed Chuha and executed every Takkalu in the retinue of the shah in the royal camp. This provoked the Takkalu tribe to rebellion, and a few days later, in an act of retaliation, they attacked the shah's retinue in Hamadan. One of the tribesman attempted to abduct the young Tahmasp, who had him put to death. Then Tahmasp ordered the general slaughter of the Takkalu tribe; many were killed, and many fled to Baghdad, where the governor, himself a Takkalu, put some to death to prove his loyalty. Eventually, the remaining Takkalu managed to flee to the Ottoman Empire. In the contemporary chronicles, the downfall of Chuha Sultan and the massacre of his tribe is dubbed "the Takkalu pestilence". Hossein Khan Shamlu thereafter assumed Chuha Sultan's position with the consent of the Qizilbash leaders.

While the civil war was ongoing among the Qizilbash, the Uzbeks under Ubayd Allah Khan conquered the borderlands. In 1528, Ubayd reconquered Astarabad and Tus and besieged Herat. Fourteen-year-old Tahmasp commanded the army and defeated the Uzbeks, distinguishing himself at the Battle of Jam. Safavid superiority in the battle was due to many different factors, one of them being their use of artillery, which they had learned from the Ottomans. The then governor of Herat and Tahmasp's regent, Hossein Khan Shamlu, distinguished himself during the battle and earned the respect of the shah. The victory, however, reduced neither the Uzbek threat nor the realm's internal chaos, since Tahmasp had to return to the west to suppress a rebellion in Baghdad. That year, the Uzbeks captured Herat; however, they allowed Sam Mirza to return to Tabriz. Their occupation did not last long, and Tahmasp drove them out in the summer of 1530. He appointed his brother, Bahram Mirza, governor of Khorasan and Ghazi Khan Takkalu, as Bahram's tutor.

By this point, Tahmasp had turned seventeen, and thus no longer needed a regent. Hossein Khan Shamlu  circumvented this challenge by having himself named as the steward to Tahmasp's newborn son, Mohammad Mirza. Hossein Khan constantly undermined the shah's power and had angered Tahmasp many times. His confidence in his power, combined with the rumours that Hossein Khan intended to depose Tahmasp and place his brother, Sam Mirza, on the throne, finally led Tahmasp to rid himself of the powerful Shamlu amir. Thus Hossein Khan was overthrown and executed in 1533. His fall was a turning point for Tahmasp, who now knew that each Turkoman leader would favour his tribe. He reduced the influence of the Qizilbash and gave the "men of the pen" bureaucracy greater power, ending the regency.

Reign

Ottoman war 

Suleiman the Magnificent, sultan of the Ottoman Empire, may have considered a strong Safavid empire a threat to his ambitious plans in the west and northwest of his realm. During the first decade of Tahmasp's reign, however, he was preoccupied with fighting the Habsburgs and the unsuccessful attempt to seize Vienna. In 1532, while the Ottomans were fighting in Hungary, Suleiman sent Olama Beg Takkalu with 50,000 troops under Fil Pasha to Iran. Olama Beg was one of many Takkalu members who, after Chuha's death, took refuge in the Ottoman Empire. The Ottomans seized Tabriz and Kurdistan, and tried to obtain support from Gilan province. Tahmasp drove the Ottomans out, but news of another Uzbek invasion prevented him from defeating them. Suleiman sent his grand vizier, Ibrahim Pasha, to occupy Tabriz in July 1534 and joined him two months later. Suleiman peacefully conquered Baghdad and Shia cities such as Najaf. Whilst the Ottomans were on the march, Tahmasp was in Balkh, campaigning against the Uzbeks.

The first Ottoman invasion caused the greatest crisis of Tahmasp's reign. Its events however are difficult to reconstruct; on an unknown date, an agent from the Shamlu tribe unsuccessfully tried to poison Tahmasp; they revolted against the shah, who had recently asserted his authority by removing Hossein Khan. Seeking to dethrone Tahmasp, they chose one of his younger brothers, Sam Mirza (who had a Shamlu guardian) as their candidate. The rebels then contacted Suleiman and asked him for support in enthroning Sam Mirza, who promised to follow a pro-Ottoman policy. Suleiman recognised him as ruler of Iran, which panicked Tahmasp's court. Tahmasp reconquered the seized territory when Suleiman went to Mesopotamia, and Suleiman led another campaign against him. Tahmasp attacked his rearguard, and Suleiman was forced to retreat to Istanbul at the end of 1535 after losing all his gains except Baghdad. After confronting the Ottomans, Tahmasp rushed to Khorasan to defeat his brother. Sam Mirza surrendered and sought mercy from Tahmasp. The shah accepted his brother's pleads and banished him to Qazvin but otherwise executed many of his advisors, namely, his Shamlu guardian.

Relations with the Ottomans remained hostile until the revolt of Alqas Mirza, another one of Tahmasp's younger brothers, who had led the Safavid army during the 1534–35 Ottoman invasion and was governor of Shirvan. He led an unsuccessful revolt against Tahmasp, who conquered Derbant in the spring of 1547 and appointed his son Ismail as governor. Alqas fled to Crimea with his remaining forces and took refuge with Suleiman. He promised to restore Sunni Islam in Iran and encouraged the Sultan to lead another campaign against Tahmasp. The new invasion sought the quick capture of Tabriz in July 1548; it soon became clear, however, that Alqas Mirza's claims of support from all the Qizilbash leaders were untrue. The long campaign focused on looting, plundering Hamadan, Qom, and Kashan before being stopped at Isfahan. Tahmasp did not fight the exhausted Ottoman army but laid waste the entire region from Tabriz to the frontier; the Ottomans could not permanently occupy the captured lands, since they soon ran out of supplies.

Eventually, Alqas Mirza was captured on the battlefield and imprisoned in a fortress, where he died. Suleiman ended his campaign, and by the fall of 1549 the remaining Ottoman forces retreated. The Ottoman sultan launched his last campaign against the Safavids in May 1554, when Ismail Mirza (Tahmasp's son) invaded eastern Anatolia and defeated Erzerum governor Iskandar Pasha. Suleiman marched from Diyarbakr towards Armenian Karabakh and reconquered the lost lands. Tahmasp divided his army into four corps and sent each in a different direction, indicating a Safavid army that had grown much larger than it was in the previous wars. With Tahmasp's Safavids holding the advantage, Suleiman had to retreat. The Ottomans allowed Iranian pilgrims to travel freely to Mecca, Medina, Karbala, and Najaf. Through this treaty, Iran had time to increase its forces and resources as its western provinces had the opportunity to recuperate from the war. This peace also demarcated the Ottoman-Safavid frontier in the north-west without the cession of large areas of territory on the Safavid side. These terms, in circumstances favourable to the Safavids, were evidence of the frustration felt by Suleiman the Magnificent at his inability to inflict a greater defeat on the Safavids.

Georgian campaigns 
Tahmasp was interested in the Caucasus, especially Georgia, for two reasons: to reduce the influence of the Ostajlu tribe (who kept their lands in southern Georgia and Armenia after the 1526 civil war) and a desire for booty, similar to that of his father. Between 1540 and 1553, Tahmasp led four campaigns against the Georgian kingdoms. The Safavid army looted Tbilisi, including its churches and the wives and children of the nobility, in the first campaign. Tahmasp also forced the governor of Tbilisi, Golbad, to convert to Islam. The King of Kartli, Luarsab I, managed to escape and went to hiding during Tahmasp's raiding. During his second invasion, ostensibly to ensure the stability of Georgian territory, he looted the farms and subjugated Levan of Kakheti. One year before the Peace of Amasya in 1554, Tahmasp led his last military campaign into the Caucasus. Throughout his campaigns, he took many prisoners, and this time he brought 30,000 Georgians to Iran. Luarsab's mother, Nestan Darejan was captured during these campaigns, but committed suicide upon incarceration. The descendants of these prisoners formed a "third force" in the Safavid administration and bureaucracy with the Turkomans and Persians and became a main rival to the other two during the later years of the Safavid Empire.

In 1555, following the Peace of Amasya, eastern Georgia remained in Iranian hands and western Georgia was ruled by the Turks. Never again did Tahmasp appear on the Caucasus frontier after the treaty. Instead, the Governor of Georgia, Shahverdi Sultan, represented Safavid power north of the Aras River. Tahmasp sought to establish his dominance by imposing several Iranian political and social institutions and placing converts to Islam on the thrones of Kartli and Kakheti; one was Davud Khan, brother of Simon I of Kartli. Son of Levan of Kakheti, Prince Jesse also appeared in Qazvin during the 1560s and converted to Islam. In return, Tahmasp granted him favours and gifts. The prince was given the old royal palace for his residence in Qazvin, and became the governor of Shaki and adjacent territories. The conversion of these Georgian princes did not dissuade the Georgian forces who tried to reconquer Tbilisi under Simon I and his father, Luarsab I of Kartli, in the Battle of Garisi; the battle ended in a stalemate, with Luarsab and the Safavid commander Shahverdi Sultan both slain in battle.

Royal refugees 

One of the most celebrated events of Tahmasp's reign was the visit of Humayun, the eldest son of Babur and emperor of the Mughal Empire, who faced rebellions by his brothers. Humayun fled to Herat, travelled through Mashhad, Nishapur, Sabzevar, and Qazvin, and met Tahmasp at Soltaniyeh in 1544. Tahmasp honoured Homayun as a guest and gave him an illustrated version of Saadi's Gulistan dating back to the reign of Abu Sa'id Mirza, Humayun's great-grandfather; however, he refused to give him political assistance unless he converted to Shia Islam. Humayun reluctantly agreed, but reverted to Sunni Islam when he returned to India; however he did not force the Iranian Shias, who came with him to India, to convert. Tahmasp also demanded a quid pro quo in which the city of Kandahar would be given to his infant son, Morad Mirza. Humayun spent Nowruz in the Shah's court and left in 1545 with an army provided by Tahmasp to regain his lost lands; his first conquest was Kandahar, which he ceded to the young Safavid prince. Morad Mirza soon died, however, and the city became a bone of contention between the two empires: the Safavids claimed that it had been given to them in perpetuity, while the Mughals maintained that it had been an appanage that expired with the death of the prince. Tahmasp began the first Safavid expedition to Kandahar in 1558, after the death of Humayun, and reconquered the city.

Another notable visitor to Tahmasp's court was Şehzade Bayezid, the fugitive Ottoman prince who rebelled against his father, Suleiman the Magnificent, and went to the Shah in the autumn 1559 with an army of 10,000 to persuade him to begin a war against the Ottomans. Although he honoured Bayezid, Tahmasp did not want to disturb the Peace of Amasya. Suspecting that Bayezid was planning a coup, he had him arrested and returned to the Ottomans; Bayezid and his children were immediately executed.

Later life and death 

Although Tahmasp rarely left Qazvin from the Peace of Amasya in 1555 to his death in 1576, he was still active during this period. A 1564 rebellion in Herat was suppressed by Masum Bek and the Khorasan governors, but the region remained troubled and was raided by the Uzbeks two years later. Tahmasp became seriously ill in 1574 and neared death twice in two months. Since he had not chosen a crown prince, the question of succession was raised by members of the royal family and Qizilbash leaders. His favourite son, Haydar Mirza, was supported by the Ustajlu tribe and the powerful Georgian court faction; the imprisoned prince Ismail Mirza was supported by Pari Khan Khanum, Tahmasp's influential daughter. The pro-Haydar faction tried to eliminate Ismail by winning the favour of the castellan of Qahqaheh Castle (where Ismail was imprisoned), but Pari Khan learned about the plot and informed Tahmasp; the shah, who was still fond of his son, ordered him to be guarded by Afshar musketeers.

Tahmasp, recovered from his illness, returned his attention to affairs of state. Remaining court tensions, however, triggered another civil war when the shah died on 14 May 1576 from poisoning. The poisoning was blamed on Abu Naser Gilani, a physician who attended Tahmasp when he was ill. According to Tarikh-e Alam-ara-ye Abbasi, "He unwisely sought recognition of his superior status vis-à-vis the other physicians; as a result, when Tahmasp died, Abu Nasr was accused of treachery in the treatment he had prescribed, and he was put to death within the palace by members of the ". Tahmasp I had the longest reign of any member of the Safavid dynasty: nine days short of fifty-two years. He died without a designated heir and the two factions in his court clashed for the throne. Haydar Mirza was murdered not long after his father's death, and Ismail Mirza became king and was crowned Ismail II. Less than two months after his enthronement, Ismail ordered a mass purge of all male members of the royal family. Only Mohammad Khodabanda, already nearly blind, and his three toddler sons survived this purge.

Policies

Administration 

Tahmasp's reign after the civil wars between the Qizilbash leaders became a "personal rule" that sought to control Turkoman influence by empowering the Persian bureaucracy. The key change was the 1535 appointment of Qazi Jahan Qazvini, who extended diplomacy beyond Iran by establishing contact with the Portuguese, the Venetians, the Mughals, and the Shiite Deccan sultanates. English explorer Anthony Jenkinson, who was received at the Safavid court in 1562, also sought to promote trade. The Habsburgs were eager to ally with the Safavids against the Ottomans. In 1529, Ferdinand I sent an envoy to Iran with the objective of a two-front attack on the Ottoman Empire the following year. The mission was unsuccessful, however, since the envoy took over a year to return. The first extant Safavid letters to a European power were sent in 1540 to Doge of Venice Pietro Lando. In response, the Doge and the Great Council of Venice commissioned Michel Membré to visit the Safavid court. In 1540, he visited Tahmasp's encampment at Marand, near Tabriz. Membré's mission lasted for three years, during which, he wrote the Relazione di Persia, one of the few European sources which describe Tahmasp's court. In his letter to Lando, Tahmasp promised to "cleanse the earth of [Ottoman] wickedness" with the help of the Holy League. The alliance, however, never bore fruit.

One of the most important events of Tahmasp's reign was his relocation of the Safavid capital, which began what is known as the Qazvin period. Although the exact date is uncertain, Tahmasp began preparations to have the royal capital moved from Tabriz to Qazvin during a 1540s period of ethnic re-settlement. The move from Tabriz to Qazvin discontinued the Turco-Mongol tradition of shifting between summer and winter pastures with the herds, ending Ismail I's nomadic lifestyle. The idea of a Turkoman state with a center in Tabriz was abandoned for an empire centered on the Iranian plateau. Moving into a city that linked the realm to Khorasan through an ancient route, allowed a greater degree of centralisation as distant provinces such as Shirvan, Georgia, and Gilan were brought into the Safavid fold. The incorporation of Gilan in particular was vital to the Safavids. To ensure his permanent control on the province, Tahmasp arranged royal marriages with the influential families in Gilan. Qazvin's non-Qizilbash population allowed Tahmasp to bring new members to his court who were unrelated to the Turkoman tribes. The city, associated with orthodoxy and stable governance, developed under Tahmasp's patronage; the era's foremost building is Chehel Sotoun.

From the transition of capitals, a new era in history-writing emerged under Tahmasp's rule. The Safavid historiography, which until then relied only on historians outside of Safavid's influence, matured and became a valued project in Tahmasp's new court. Tahmasp is the only Safavid monarch to have recorded his memories, known as Tazkera-ye Shah Tahmasb. On the shah's behalf, Abdi Beg Shirazi, a secretary-accountant in the royal chancellery, wrote a world history named Takmelat al-akhbar, which he dedicated it to Pari Khan Khanum, Tahmasp's daughter. Although intended to be a world history, only the last part of the book which covers the reigns of Ismail I and Tahmasp up until 1570 was published. He also commissioned Abol-Fath Hosseini to rewrite Safvat as-safa, the oldest surviving text regarding Safi-ad-din Ardabili and the Sufi beliefs of the Safavids, in order to legitimise his  claim. All of the historians under Tahmasp's patronage centred their works around one main goal: to tell the history of the Safavid dynasty. They defined themselves as 'Safavid' historians, as living in a Safavid period of Iranian history, a concept that had not been seen in the earlier chronicles of the dynasty. This new definement has its roots in the change of the capital and the urbanisation of the Safavid nomadic lifestyle. Historians such as Charles Melville and Sholeh Quinn thus consider Tahmasp's reign as the start of the "real flourishing of Safavid historiography".

Military 
The Safavid military evolved during Tahmasp's reign. The first corps of gunners and musketeers, developed initially during Ismail I's reign, came to be used in his army. A court chronicle's retelling of Battle of Jam and a military review in 1530 show that the Safavid army was armed with several hundred light canons and several thousand infantrymen.

After the Peace of Amasya in 1555, Tahmasp became an avaricious person who did not care how and where his troops obtained their pay, even if it was through criminal means. By 1575, Iran’s troops had not been paid for four years. They are said to have accepted this because, as one chronicler put it, ‘they loved the shah so much’.

Religion 

Tahmasp described himself as a "pious Shia mystic king". His religious views and the extent to which they influenced Safavid religious policy is the most interesting aspect of his reign for historians, both contemporary and modern. As the Italian historian Biancamaria Scarcia Amoretti has noted, “the modern originality of Persian Shi'ism has its roots [with Shah Tahmasp].” Until 1533, the Qizilbash leaders (worshipping Ismail I as the promised Mahdi) urged the young Tahmasp to continue in his father's footsteps; that year, he had a spiritual rebirth, performed an act of repentance and outlawed irreligious behaviour. Tahmasp rejected his father's claim of being a mahdi, becoming a mystical lover of Ali and a king bound to sharia, but still enjoyed villagers travelling to his palace in Qazvin to touch his clothing. Tahmasp held firmly to the controversial Shia belief in the imminent coming of the Mahdi. He refused to allow his favourite sister, Shahzada Sultanim, to marry, because he was keeping her as a bride for the Mahdi. He claimed connections with Ali and Sufi saints, such as his ancestor Safi al-Din, through dreams in which he foresaw the future. Tahmasp had other superstitious beliefs too; for instance, his obsession with the occult science of geomancy. According to the Venetian diplomat, Vincenzo degli Alessandri, the shah was so devoted to practice geomancy that he had not left his palace for a decade. He also observed that Tahmasp was worsipped by his people as a godlike being possessing a frail and old body. Tahmasp wanted the poets of his court to write about Ali, rather than him. He sent copies of the Quran as gifts to several Ottoman sultans; overall, during his reign, eighteen copies of the Quran were sent to Istanbul and all were encrusted with jewels and gold.

Tahmasp saw Twelverism as a new doctrine of kingship, giving the  authority in religious and legal matters, and appointing Shaykh Ali al-Karaki as the deputy of the Hidden Imam. During the 1530s and 1540s, they hegemonised the Safavid court in Tabriz and according to Iskandar Beg, “any wish of theirs was translated into reality almost before it was uttered… although they were guilty of unlawful practices.” During Tahmasp's reign, Persian scholars accepted the Safavid claims to  heritage and called him "the Husaynid". Tahmasp embarked on a wide-scale urban program designed to reinvent the city of Qazvin as a centre of Shiite piety and orthodoxy, expanding the Shrine of Husayn (son of Ali al-Rida, the eighth Imam). He was also attentive to his ancestral Sufi order in Ardabil, building the Janat Sarai mosque to encourage visitors and hold  (Sufi spiritual ceremony). This encouraged Tahmasp's followers to see themselves as belonging to a community too large to be bound by tribal or other local social orders. Although Tahmasp continued the Shia conversion in Iran, unlike his father he did not coerce other religious groups; he had a long-established acknowledgment and patronage of Christian Armenians.

Arts 

In his youth, Tahmasp was inclined towards calligraphy and art and patronised masters in both. His preeminent and acclaimed contribution to the Safavid arts was his patronage of Persian miniature manuscripts that took place during the first half of his reign. He was the namesake of one of the most celebrated illustrated manuscripts of the Shahnameh, which was commissioned by his father around 1522 and completed during the mid-1530s. He encouraged painters such as Kamāl ud-Dīn Behzād, bestowing a royal painting workshop for masters, journeymen, and apprentices with exotic materials such as ground gold and lapis lazuli. Tahmasp's artists illustrated the Khamsa of Nizami, and he worked on Chehel Sotoun's balcony paintings. The Tarikh-e Alam-ara-ye Abbasi calls Tahmasp's reign the zenith of Safavid calligraphic and pictorial art. Tahmasp lost interest in the miniature arts around 1555 and, accordingly, disbanded the royal workshop and allowed his artists to practice elsewhere. His patronage of arts, however, has been praised by many modern art historians such as James Elkins and Stuart Cary Welch. The American historian, Douglas Streusand, calls him 'the greatest Safavid patron'. Colin P. Mitchell associates Tahmasp's patronage with the revival of Iranian artistic and cultural life.

The reigns of Tahmasp and his father, Ismail I, are considered as the most productive era of the history of the Azeri Turkish language and literature. The renowned poet, Fuzuli, who wrote in Turkish, Persian, and Arabic, flourished during this era. In his memoir, Tahmasp denotes his love for both Persian and Turkish poetry. During the later years of his life, however, he came to despise poets and poetry; as his devotion to the Quran increased, he no longer counted poets as pious men, for many of them were addicted to wine, an irreligious behaviour. Tahmasp refused to allow poets in his court and ceased to regard them with favour. According to Tazkera-ye Tohfe-ye Sāmi by his brother, Sam Mirza, there were 700 poets during the reigns of the first two Safavid kings. After Tahmasp's religious conversion, many joined Humayun; those who remained and wrote erotic  (sonnets), such as Vahshi Bafqi and Mohtasham Kashani, were shunned. Other poets such as Naziri Nishapuri and 'Orfi Shirazi chose to leave Iran and emigrate to the Mughal court, where they pioneered the rise of Indian-style poetry, known for its high-rhetorical texts of metaphors, mystical-philosophical themes and allegories.

Coinage 

Tahmasp I's coins were characterised by the region they were minted in. The  was used in Shirvan; in Mazandaran,  was minted, and Khuzestan used the  currency. By the 1570s, most of these autonomous monetary were unified. These weight reductions were the results of Ottoman and Uzbek invasions as well as the Ottoman trade ban which had a devastating impact on trade, and thus on the shah’s revenues. According the Venetian Michel Membré, no merchant could have travelled to Iran through Ottoman borders without permission from the sultan. All travellers were stopped and arrested if they had no royal permit.

In his coins, Arabic is no longer the only language used, in his  (folus-i shahi) coins, the phrase "May be eternally [condemned] to the damnation of God / He, who alters [the rate of] the royal folus" is minted in Persian. Old copper coins were released anew with the countermarks folus-i shahi, 'adl-e shahi, etc. that showed their new value.

Family 

Tahmasp, unlike his ancestors who married Turkomans, took Georgians and Circassians as wives; most of his children had Caucasian mothers. His only Turkoman consort was his chief wife, Sultanum Begum of the Mawsillu tribe (a marriage of state), who gave birth to two sons: Mohammad Khodabanda and Ismail II. Tahmasp had a poor relationship with Ismail, whom he imprisoned on suspicion that his son might attempt a coup against him. However, he was attentive to his other children; On his orders, his daughters were instructed in administration, art, and scholarship, and Haydar Mirza (his favourite son, born of a Georgian slave) participated in state affairs.

Tahmasp had seven known consorts:
 Sultanum Begum (c. 15161593 in Qazvin), Tahmasp's chief wife, from the Mawsillu tribe, mother of his two older sons
 Sultan-Agha Khanum, a Circassian, sister of Shamkhal Sultan Cherkes (governor of Sakki), mother of Pari Khan Khanum and Suleiman Mirza
 Sultanzada Khanum, a Georgian slave, mother of Haydar Mirza
 Zahra Baji, a Georgian, mother of Mustafa Mirza and Ali Mirza
 Huri Khan Khanum, a Georgian, mother of Zeynab Begum and Maryam Begum
 A sister of Waraza Shalikashvili
 Zaynab Sultan Khanum (m. 1549; died in Qazvin October 1570 and buried in Mashhad), widow of Tahmasp's younger brother Bahram Mirza

He had thirteen sons:
 Mohammad Khodabanda (1532 – 1595 or 1596), Shah of Iran (r. 1578–1587)
 Ismail II (31 May 1537 – 24 November 1577), Shah of Iran (r. 1576–77)
 Murad Mirza (d. 1545), nominal governor of Kandahar; died in infancy
 Suleiman Mirza (d. 9 November 1576), Governor of Shiraz, killed during Ismail II's purge
 Haydar Mirza (28 September 1556 – 9 November 1576), self-proclaimed Shah of Iran for a day after Tahmasp's death; killed by his guards in Qazvin
 Mustafa Mirza, (d. 9 November 1576), killed during Ismail II's purge; his daughter married Abbas the Great
 Junayd Mirza (d. 1577), killed during Ismail II's purge
 Mahmud Mirza (d. 7 March 1577), governor of Shirvan and Lahijan, killed during Ismail II's purge
 Imam Qoli Mirza (died 7 March 1577), killed during Ismail II's purge
 Ali Mirza (d. 31 January 1642), blinded and imprisoned by Abbas the Great
 Ahmad Mirza (died 7 March 1577), killed during Ismail II's purge
 Murad Mirza (d. 1577), killed during Ismail II's purge
 Zayn al-Abedin Mirza, died in childhood
 Musa Mirza, died in childhood

Tahmasp probably had thirteen daughters, eight of whom are known:
 Gawhar Sultan Begum (d. 1577), married Sultan Ibrahim Mirza
 Pari Khan Khanum (d. 1578), died by the orders of Khayr al-Nisa Begum
 Zeynab Begum (d. 31 May 1640), married Ali-Qoli Khan Shamlu
 Maryam Begum (d. 1608), married Khan Ahmad Khan
 Shahrbanu Khanum, married Salman Khan Ustajlu
 Khadija Begum (d. after 1564), married Jamshid Khan (grandson of Amira Dabbaj, a local ruler in western Gilan)
 Fatima Sultan Khanum (d. 1581), married Amir Khan Mawsillu
 Khanish Begum, married Shah Nimtullah Amir Nizam al-Din Abd al-Baqi (leader of the Ni'matullāhī order)

Legacy 
Tahmasp I's reign started in an era of civil wars between the Qizilbash leaders after the death of Ismail I, whose charismatic characterisation as Messiah, which had driven the Qizilbash to follow him, came to an end with Tahmasp's succession. In contrast to his father, Tahmasp did not possess charisma in any political or spiritual sense, nor was he old enough to prove himself a fierce warrior on the battlefield, a quality valued by the Qizilbash. Eventually, Tahmasp did overcome that challenge; he proved himself a worthy military commander in the Battle of Jam against the Uzbeks and, instead of facing the Ottomans directly in the battlefield, he preferred to loot their rearguards. Even the ability to survive against the much larger Ottoman army marks him as a master of Fabian tactics. Tahmasp knew that he could not replace his father as a charismatic spiritual leader, and while he struggled to restore his family's legitimacy amongst the Qizilbash, he also had to craft a public figure of himself to convince the wider population of his right to rule as the new Safavid shah. Thus, he became a devout follower of Shi'ism and maintained this image with exaggerated piety until the end of his reign. This zealous image helped him to break the influence of the Qizilbash, and he became able to take the reins of power within ten years, after the realm had been through the civil war between the plotting tribal chieftains. He thus established a standard public image for Safavid kings: a zealous monarch who functioned as a representative of the Hidden Imam. However, none of his successors kept this image as zealously as him. Even after consolidating his power, Tahmasp had little political leverage compared to the Ottoman Empire. However, he successfully laid the foundation for Abbas the Great's transformation of the Safavid polity by bringing Caucasian slaves into his realm. He thus created the core of the force that changed the political balance of the empire in his grandson's time.

Tahmasp I made little impression on Western historians, who often compared him with his father. He is portrayed as a "miser" and a "religious bigot". He was accused of never leaving the harem and it was said that he divided his time between sexual liaisons with his favourites and foretelling the future. This characterisation has made an obscure figure out of Tahmasp as a king and a person. However, there are several instances recorded by the contemporary historians which denoted the more favourable sides of the shah's character: the fact that, despite his greed, piety led him to forgo taxes of about 30,000 tomans because collecting them would offend the religious law; his speech to the envoys of Suleiman the Magnificent, who had come to collect the fugitive Şehzade Bayezid, showed his political skill; he patronised the arts and had a highly cultured mind. According to Colin P. Mitchell, it is an achievement that he was able to not only maintain his father's empire from dissolution but also expanded it whilst being contemporaneous with Suleiman the Magnificent, the most successful Ottoman sultan. Thus the Safavid dynasty gained an ideological underpinning much stronger than the initial premise of the right of conquest. By the end of his reign, Tahmasp's success in keeping the empire together allowed the Persian elite of the bureaucracy to assume bureaucratic and ideological custodianship of the Safavid empire. This allowed Tahmasp and his successors to gain dynastic legitimacy and to cultivate an imperial cult of personality that prevented another civil war, even when the empire was at its most fragile position.

Notes

References

Bibliography

Further reading

External links
A king's book of kings: the Shah-nameh of Shah Tahmasb, an exhibition catalogue from The Metropolitan Museum of Art (fully available online as PDF)

Critics of Sunni Islam
Safavid monarchs
16th-century people of Safavid Iran
Modern child monarchs
1514 births
1576 deaths
Azerbaijani-language poets
16th-century monarchs in the Middle East
Mawsillu
People from Isfahan
Deaths by poisoning
Patrons of the arts
Burials at Imam Reza Shrine
16th-century Iranian people